Montegrande is an archaeological site in the Cajamarca department of Jaén province in Jaén District, Peru, a spiral temple or enclosure built c. 3000 BCE, by a culture that overlapped the current border with Ecuador. At 5000 years old, the site is as old as  Caral.

Excavations

Excavations began in 2009 with funding from the Andean Community, for eight Ecuadorian archaeologists, led by Francisco Valdez, and nine Peruvian archaeologists, directed by Quirino Olivera.

On the Peruvian side, the sites of Casual and Las Juntas in Bagua, were excavated, as well as at Montegrande and San Isidro in Jaén. Until then it had been thought that the sites were simply hills, on top of which the  pre-Inca culture had left some remains. Constructions so ancient   in that area of ​​the Peruvian jungle had had not been considered. Only archaeologist Julio C. Tello had postulated (circa 1920) an Amazonian origin for Andean culture, but other researchers dismissed this at the time.

Atop Montegrande hill the foundations of an abandoned, half-built Catholic church were found. The place had become a dump and smoking place. The site was cleared and the modern constructions removed. Excavations initially revealed yellow steps and floors. Then they removed a layer of clay and pebbles, revealing an impressive spiral architectural structure. The excavations also uncovered the remains of a man who apparently was sacrificed before the construction was complete.

At other sites investigated by the binational archaeological project, important discoveries were also made. In San Isidro an elite burial was discovered. In Casual and Las Juntas polychrome murals were found, different from those of both the highland and coastal cultures. On the Ecuadorian side, a spiral architectural structure, similar to Montegrande, was discovered at the Santa Ana-La Florida site in Palanda Canton, and the tomb of an elite personage was found, as well as evidence of cocoa cultivation dating back 5,500 to 5,350 years, in other words 1,500 years older than that earlier found in Mexico. Until then, domesticated cocoa had been thought to have a Mesoamerican origin.

Spiral construction
The spiral enclosure of Montegrande is built of adobe and rounded stones. It is believed to have been a ceremonial temple, with a tomb beneath it of someone important, possibly a healer or a priest, if it follows the pattern of the sites in Palanda and San Isidro.

Spirals seem to have had special meaning in the beliefs of the Andean world. Archaeologists believe it represents a coiled snake, a symbolism that also appears at other sites nearby. The spiral shape is also reflected in the famous Nazca Lines (monkey geoglyph). It is the shape of the snail, or Spondylus, of the Ecuadorian coast, also found in Jaén and Bagua, showing that trade took place between these territories.

References

Pre-Columbian indigenous peoples of the Amazon
Archaeological discoveries in Peru
Archaeological cultures of South America
Tombs in Peru
Cultural heritage of Peru
History of Peru
Archaic period in the Americas
Archaeology of Peru